This list of museums in Idaho contains museums which are defined for this context as institutions (including nonprofit organizations, government entities, and private businesses) that collect and care for objects of cultural, artistic, scientific, or historical interest and make their collections or related exhibits available for public viewing. Museums that exist only in cyberspace (i.e., virtual museums) are not included.

Museums

Defunct museums
 Hess Heritage Museum, Ashton 
 Ketchum Sun Valley Historical Society Heritage & Ski Museum, Ketchum, collections now part of the Sun Valley Museum of History
 Sacajawea Museum at Spalding, former museum near the site of the Spalding Mission whose contents were sold off after a flood in 1963; featured a buckskin dress from Sacajawea, various Nez Perce Chief headdresses including two from the young Chief Joseph, and a dugout canoe from the Lewis and Clark expedition

Regions

The Idaho Department of Commerce tourism division has divided the state into these seven regions which are used in the table above:
 Northern - Counties: Benewah, Bonner, Boundary, Kootenai, and Shoshone,
North Central - Counties: Clearwater, Idaho, Latah, Lewis, and Nez Perce
Southwest - Counties: Ada, Adams, Boise, Canyon, Elmore, Gem, Owyhee, Payette, Valley, and Washington
Central - Counties: Blaine, Butte, Camas, Custer, and Lemhi
South Central - Counties: Cassia, Gooding, Jerome, Lincoln, Minidoka, and Twin Falls
Southeast - Counties: Bingham, Bonneville, Clark, Fremont, Jefferson, Madison, and Teton
Eastern - Counties: Bannock, Bear Lake, Caribou, Franklin, Oneida, and Power

See also

 List of nature centers in Idaho

References

 Idaho Association of Museums

External links
Visit Idaho - Museums

Museums
Museums
Idaho
Museums